Dead Man's Curve is a nickname for a stretch of road that has claimed a number of lives.

Dead Man's Curve may also refer to:
 Dead Man's Curve (1928 film), a silent American film
 "Dead Man's Curve" (song), a song by Jan & Dean
 Deadman's Curve, Jan & Dean biopic
 Dead Man's Curve (band), a London surf music band
 Dead Man's Curve, alternative name for The Curve (1998 film)
 Dead man's curve, height-velocity diagram, which is a graph that charts safe/unsafe flight profiles relevant to a specific helicopter